Conowingo Creek is a  tributary of the Susquehanna River in Lancaster County, Pennsylvania and Cecil County, Maryland.

The name of the creek comes from the Lenape, meaning "at the rapids".

It originates near the northern border of East Drumore Township and flows south, meeting Jackson Run near the southern border. It enters Fulton Township just above the birthplace of Robert Fulton, for whom the township is named. Flowing along the east side of Wakefield, it meets Little Conowingo Creek below the town, and begins to flow through hillier terrain before entering Maryland. Its valley soon deepens into a gorge as it approaches the Susquehanna. It empties into the Conowingo Reservoir at Pilot Station.

See also
List of rivers of Maryland
List of rivers of Pennsylvania

References

 

Rivers of Maryland
Rivers of Pennsylvania
Tributaries of the Susquehanna River
Rivers of Lancaster County, Pennsylvania
Rivers of Cecil County, Maryland